Vincenzo Sofo (born 18 December 1986) is an Italian politician.

Biography
Sofo graduated in Economics from the Catholic University of the Sacred Heart.

From 2007 to 2009 he was the leader of The Right's youth wing in the Milan area. In 2009 he co-founded and directed until 2017 the think tank IlTalebano.com, approaching the Northern League, whose transformation into national movement he advocated. In 2011 he was elected councilor of the 6th Municipality of Milan. In 2016 he ran for the city council of Milan, obtaining 260 preferences and missing the election.

In 2019 he was elected to the European Parliament in the Southern constituency, but he was one of the three Italian candidates suspended pending the exit of the British deputies for Brexit. He officially took his seat on February 1, 2020.

Personal life
Sofo has been engaged to the former French MP Marion Maréchal since 2018. The couple got married on September 11, 2021.

References

Living people
MEPs for Italy 2019–2024
Lega Nord MEPs
Lega Nord politicians
1986 births
Politicians from Milan
Università Cattolica del Sacro Cuore alumni